Ligniera pilorum is a plant pathogen infecting wheat.

References

External links
 Index Fungorum

Wheat diseases
Endomyxa
Species described in 1925